Visions is an album by American jazz guitarist Grant Green featuring performances recorded in 1971 and released on the Blue Note label.

Reception

The Allmusic review by Stephen Thomas Erlewine awarded the album 3 stars and stated "Visions is a bit laid-back, and the electric piano-heavy arrangements are a little dated, but Grant Green never made a commercial pop-jazz album as appealing and satisfying".

Track listing
 "Does Anybody Really Know What Time It Is?" (Robert Lamm) - 5:10
 "Maybe Tomorrow" (Marilyn Bergman, Alan Bergman, Quincy Jones) - 4:54
 "Mozart Symphony #40 in G Minor, K550, 1st Movement" (Wolfgang Amadeus Mozart) - 4:06
 "Love on a Two-Way Street" (Bert Keyes, Sylvia Robinson) - 4:43
 "Cantaloupe Woman" (Ben Dixon) - 5:29
 "We've Only Just Begun" (Roger Nichols, Paul Williams) - 5:09
 "Never Can Say Goodbye" (Clifton Davis) - 5:04
 "Blues for Abraham" (Eloise Riggins) - 2:31
Recorded at Rudy Van Gelder Studio, Englewood Cliffs, New Jersey on May 21, 1971

Personnel
Grant Green - guitar
Billy Wooten - vibes
Emmanuel Riggins - electric piano
Chuck Rainey - electric bass
Idris Muhammad - drums
Ray Armando - conga
Harold Caldwell - drums, percussion

References 

Blue Note Records albums
Grant Green albums
1971 albums
Albums recorded at Van Gelder Studio
Albums produced by George Butler (record producer)